The Shirgj Church, also known as the Monastery of Saints Sergius and Bacchus (Manastir Svetih Sergija i Vakha), is a ruined former Benedictine monastery in the village of Shirgj on the Bojana River in northern Albania. The church was built by Serbian Queen Helen of Anjou in 1290, dedicated to Saints Sergius and Bacchus, seemingly on top of a pre-6th century basilica.

History

Early history
The church was built in 1290 by Helen of Anjou, queen consort of the Serbian Kingdom, wife of Serbian king Stefan Uroš I, and mother of kings Dragutin and Milutin. Apparently the monastery was constructed on top of an existing structure: according to apocryphal documents, the original monastery is mentioned as erected by Justinian, whereas in other sources its existence is mentioned as an abbey starting from 1100. The presence of a pillar of black granite, a material which originates from Syria and was often used in 6th-century basilicas in Albania, demonstrates that the construction of the original building may indeed lie in the 6th century.

A document dated 22 October 1330 mentions the monastery as the rendezvous point of the king of Rascia with ambassadors of Ragusa. In another document dated 1333, the monastery is mentioned as the customs' place of the kingdom of Rascia.

In the Chronicle of the Priest of Duklja, it is alleged that several members of the Vojislavljević dynasty of Duklja were buried here, such as Mihailo I, Constantine Bodin, Dobroslav, Vladimir and Gradinja.

Modern history

Marino Bizzi, the Archbishop of Antivari at the time, wrote in a 1611 report to the Vatican that heavy damages were inflicted to the church as a result of the Ottoman presence in Albania. In 1684, Pjetër Bogdani reported that the church's bell had been put underground. Daniele Farlati also mentioned the church in his Illyricum sacrum. In 1790 archbishop Frang Borci informed Coletti, Farlati's assistant, who was about to republish Illyricum sacrum, that the church was the most beautiful of Albania.

The French consul in Iskodra noted that the monastery's frescoes could still be seen in the church in 1905. At that time only three of the four perimeter walls were still standing. Ippen, then Austrian consul of Iskodra, observed that in the late 1800s and early 1900s the gravediggers of Shirgj would find old mosaics. At present, only a single wall remains and the mosaics can no longer be seen.

The monastery has been under the Vatican's jurisdiction during all of its active life. It was listed as a Monument of Culture by the Albanian government in 1970.

The ruins were visited by Patriarch Irinej of the Serbian Orthodox Church in 2014.

References

Further reading

Churches in Albania
Benedictine monasteries in Albania
Christian monasteries established in the 13th century
Churches completed in 1290
Buildings and structures in Shkodër
Cultural Monuments of Albania
Gothic architecture in Albania